EFSM may refer to:
Eligibility for free school meals
European Financial Stabilisation Mechanism
Extended finite-state machine